= Socio-Economic Planning Sciences =

- Discipline: Socio-economics, public policy
- Language: English
- Edited by: Rajan Batta

Publication details
- History: 1967–present
- Publisher: Elsevier
- Frequency: Bi-monthly
- Impact factor: 6.2 (2023)

Standard abbreviations
- ISO 4: Socio-Econ. Plan. Sci.

Indexing
- ISSN: 0038-0121
- LCCN: 68007282
- OCLC no.: 905451985

Links
- Journal homepage; Online archive

Socio-Economic Planning Sciences (full title: Socio-Economic Planning Sciences: The International Journal of Public Sector Decision-Making) is a bi-monthly peer-reviewed scientific journal covering socio-economics as it relates to development economics and public policy. It was established in 1967 and is published by Elsevier. The editor-in-chief is Rajan Batta (University at Buffalo). According to the Journal Citation Reports, the journal has a 2023 impact factor of 6.2.
